In the Federal Republic of Germany, craft trades are governed by the Crafts and Trade Code ( or HwO or HandwO). This administrative law covers the commercial practice of handicraft; vocational education and training in the craft sector; and the self-administration of this economic sector. This law is a special trade regulation, and its provisions on vocational training form a special law within the Vocational Training Act.

Articles 3 paragraph 1,(c), 14 and 43-55 of the EC Treaty - (Freedom of establishment, freedom to provide services and mutual recognition of diplomas)

The EC Treaty lays down the principle that the self-employed (whether working in commercial, industrial or craft occupations 
or the liberal professions) the economic operators, established in the territory of a member state, may exercise an economic activity in all member states in two ways. Self-employed person and professionals or legal persons, within the meaning of 
article 48 EC Treaty, who are legally acting in one member state, may carry on an economic activity in a stable and continuous 
way in another Member State (freedom of establishment: Article 43) or offer and provide their services in other Member States 
on a temporary basis while remaining in their country of origin (freedom to provide services: Article 49). This implies eliminating discrimination on the grounds of nationality and, if these freedoms are to be used effectively, the adoption of measures to make it easier to exercise them, especially harmonisation of national access rules or their mutual recognition.

German Crafts and Trade - their Special Feature: License to Market Access

The Crafts and Trade Code and its socio-economic significance

An Overview

— The Crafts and Trade Code (HWO/CTC) defines the license to craftsmanship. This means that the Master Craftsman's diploma is mandatory for self-employment. (Adequate qualifications are recognized through special permission). [ 1 ]

— The legislator regulates the practice of the profession. It defines the activities which are considered to be crafts and trade. It demarcates the career profiles and regulates the professional training.

— Moreover, the tasks of the crafts and trade organizations are specified. [ 2 ]

—The Crafts and Trade Code (CTC) thus restricts the free choice of profession expressly given by the Article 12 and the Article 3 (Equality before the law) of German Constitution called Basic Law (GG). According to the said Article 12, all Germans have the right to freely choose their trade or profession, their place of work and their place of training. The said Article 3 (Equality before Law) says, that the practice of trades and professions may be regulated by law.

— As per the constitutional law and from the constitutional-economic point of view, the government interventions in the rights of an individual to freedom and to equality before law have to be explained.

— Accordingly, only those restrictions are generally acceptable, which serve the public interest.

— Laws are in accordance with this criterion, which are independent of the changing social and-political conditions capable of getting the approval in the long run.

What does the Master Craftsman’s Diploma certify?

— As a kind of "Brand product image", it certifies that the craftsman

a) has the professional and mercantile knowledge, abilities and experience, to carry out the respective work orders independently
b) so that the corresponding technical and entrepreneurial standards are guaranteed to protect the interests of the consumers (Consumer protection), of the crafts and trade (Quality of the craft and trade) and of the craftsmen themselves (Bankruptcy risk).

— Till the amendment of the law in January 2004, the regulatory purpose of the obligation to have the Master Craftsman's Diploma    (Big Certificate of Competency) was that “this should guarantee the level of efficiency, productive power of the crafts and trade and the younger talent for the whole trade and industry.

— Since this amendment in the law, the purpose of the obligation to have the Master Craftsman’s Diploma is to repel “the risks for the health or the life of the third party” in the Crafts and Trade

— A direct impact on the wording of the legal text cannot be inferred. However, the law must be interpreted according to the regulatory purpose intended by the legislator, because many things are not clearly regulated through the Crafts and Trade Code, so that the interpretation plays a very great role.

Quality Assurance

— The reason given by its proponents for retaining the Master Craftsman's Diploma as a license to market access is that the vendors and customers are differently informed about the quality of the services offered (asymmetric information). It can otherwise initiate an unwanted competition downwards, if only the prices are compared.[ 3 ]

— The proviso of the existing Master Craftsman's Diploma would be then in the public inter-est, when it was to compensate for the shortcomings of the market or for a market failure (for instance due to asymmetric information in the Crafts and Trade sector).[ 4 ]

Partly, these reservations are to a certain extent already clarified through the reality (e.g. Internet), because due to the lack of purchasing power, the customer still  strives more for getting a more favourable price for a product or for  a service. On the whole, the market segments and prices for services in the crafts and trade are becoming more transparent through the Websites such as "undertool.de.

— As per the argumentation, a negative breed is emerging among the vendors and a ruinous competition is emerging in the crafts and trade markets.[ 5 ]

This trend of competition is anyway going to increase in Germany due to the EU-expansion towards the East, even if it is till date the case only in some small domains. Since due to a judgment of the European Court of Justice (ECJ) the obligation for registration according to the § 9 of the Crafts and Trade Code (CTC) has been abolished for the foreign companies, which would like to offer a service in Germany, a large part of the German Crafts and Trade is itself ousting this market access regulation in the long term.[6]

— The Counter argument is: There is an unequal distribution of the information in many markets, not only within the domain of the crafts and trade. [ 7 ]

— But a special obligation of the state for a welfare service to the crafts and trade can not be derived from this. [ 8 ]

— It can be assumed that the customers can judge the quality latest after the service has been delivered and can, in case of discontent, change the vendor.

— One can also fall back on the experiences of the others (Reputation), be it through the recommendations or through expert knowledge (as this also works for the illicit work).

— On the other hand, the crafts and trade companies can present the consumers the differences in quality through
 
a) voluntary warranty of quality
b) service offers
c) the Master Craftsman's title as a voluntary comprehensive characteristic of quality [ 9 ]

Prevention of Danger

— Consumer protection from injuries to health through faulty products and services is in general interest.

— Specifications for the Trade, Commerce and Industry Regulation Act, the technical standards, prescribed qualifications and the liability law can be derived from this.

— Especially in comparison with the overseas, high standards of technical training for the final examination of the apprentices already offer a preventive protection to the crafts and trade.

— Existing laws such as the Law of product liability or the German Construction Contract Procedures (GCCP) are sufficiently respected.

— Indeed, the question arises, whether additional subjective restrictions for licensing such as the Master Craftsman's Diploma and/or six-year professional experience, are appropriate for getting the special permission (4 years experience of apprentice in a key position according to the § 7b of the Crafts and Trade Code). This question is actually important because in the rest of Europe, such a restrictive law does not exist (Exceptions are Austria and Luxembourg with a similar, but moderate restriction).

— To find the right measure is a normative decision and can ultimately be taken only on political level [10].

— However, the proof of "masterly" professional knowledge and talents can in this context only be justified with the prevention of danger.

— Knowledge of industrial management and pedagogy, which is also a part of the examina-tion for the Master Craftsman's Diploma, must be ignored because it is not relevant. After all, there is no mercantile examination for a Restaurant owner, but the bakers and confectioners have to undergo such an examination.

— Qualifications such as the Master Craftsman's Diploma, once acquired lose their special meaning due to the rapid technical change, if one does not keep on undergoing some advanced training.

— A 100% protection from injuries due to a human or technical failure can't be warranted even through additional qualifications. Mostly, the problems are caused by the bungling during the execution or inappropriate handling of the materials or machines and devices.

— Despite the public welfare, which has been highlighted above, no standards for industrial and environmental safety have been, for example, incorporated in the Crafts and Trade Code.

Equality before Law

— Regulations for a license to a profession and for practicing a profession need to also be regularly scrutinized, because they are related to the Basic principle of equality in the Article 3 of the German Basic Law (GG).

— Especially due to the changing economic framework, there is often a danger of discrimi-nation (the so-called discrimination of natives, i.e. German craftsmen have a disadvantage over the other European craftsmen because of the hard market access).

— We should not ignore the fact that the Crafts and Trade Code (CTC) of 1953 with its cur-rent regulation is based on a judgment of the Federal Constitutional Court of 1961 and for its decision, this court had that time relied upon the conditions and data of the 1950s[ 11 ].

— The court has justified the Big Certificate of Competency as a regulation for the choice of profession and not for practicing the profession.

— After considering the multitude of the factors, which are independent of the constitutional state and substantiate the special position of the class of craftsmen in the whole economy (e.g. turnover, number of employees, promotion of young people for the trade and industry, significance for the medium scale industry and the social set-up), the Honorable court came to the conclusion that these public interests constitute community goods of such high value that they justify a restriction on the free choice of profession.

— In the course of the freedom of service in the member states of European Union, the pressure of reforms has increased regarding this factor, especially through the expansion to-wards the East.

— With a relaxation of the laws for the entry to the market, the problem of the so-called discrimination of the natives would get defused.

— Due to the fall of the market access barrier, more and more people would be starting their own business and beside a favourable development in the job market, it could also lead to more dynamics in this market segment, since many jobs, which were earlier not carried out or executed only in the DIY- (Do-it-yourself) procedure or were illicit works, would be now onwards demanded on the official job market.

References

[1] See Landman/Rohmer, Trade, Commerce and Industry Regulation Act (Gewerbeord-nung), Loose-leaf-collection, Vol. 1, §1 Marginal 3, P. 6

[2] See Detlef Perner, Co-determination in the Crafts and trade? The social and political and role of the Chambers of Crafts and trade in the network of the corporate governance (Mitbestimmung im Handwerk? Die politische und soziale Funktion der Handwerkskammern im Geflecht der Unternehmensorganisation), Cologne 1983.
Valentin Chesi, Structure and role of the Crafts and trade organization in Germany since 1933 (Struktur und Funktionen der Handwerksorganisation in Deutschland seit 1933), Berlin 1966.
Peter John, Chambers of Crafts and trade in the twilight (Handwerkskammern im Zwielicht), Frankfurt/M 1979.

[3] See Gerd Habermann, The German Crafts and Trade Code as a relic of the trade ties (Die deutsche Handwerksordnung als Relikt der Gewerbebindung), in: Ordo, Yearbook for the System of Economy and Society (Ordo, Jahrbuch für die Ordnung von Wirtschaft und Gesellschaft), Vol. 41, 1990

[4] See Markus Fredebeul-Krein; Angela Schürfeld, Regulations for the entry to the Crafts and trade market and for technical services. An economic analysis (Marktzutrittsregulierungen im Handwerk und bei technischen Dienstleistungen. Eine ökonomische Analyse), Cologne 1998

Thomas Fellecker;Stefan Fellecker, Crafts and Trade Code and the Big Certificate of Competency  – the historical truth (Handwerksordnung und großer Befähigungsnachweis – die historische Wahrheit), Chamber of Crafts and Trade Lüneburg, April 2003

[5] See ZDH (Zentralverband des Deutschen Handwerks/Umbrella organization of German Crafts and Trade), Statement of the ZDH about the amendments in the Crafts and Trade Code (Die Stellungnahme des ZDH zur Reform der HWO), printed in: Orientations about the social and economic policy (Orientierungen zur Wirtschafts- und Gesellschaftspolitik), 96, 2/2003

[6] See Birgit Buschmann; Wojciech Golenbiewski, Co-operations in the Crafts and Trade with a view of the EU-expansion towards the East (Kooperationen im Handwerk mit Blick auf die EU-Osterweiterung), Mannheim 2003

[7] See Ingo Stüben, The German Crafts and Trade. The Big Certificate of Competency (Mas-ter Craftsman's Diploma) as a criterion for the entry to the market (Das Deutsche Handwerk. Der große Befähigungsnachweis (Meisterbrief) als Kriterium des Marktzutritts), Magdeburg 2006

[8] See Ulrich Briefs, German backwardness. Everything forbidden – The German Crafts and trade Code needs to be abolished (Deutsche Rückständigkeit. Alles verboten – Die deutsche Handwerksordnung gehört abgeschafft), in: Stefan Bollmann (Ed.), Patient Germany. A therapy (Patient Deutschland. Eine Therapie), Munich 2002

[9] See Ingo Stüben, The German Handicraft. A Pillar of the changing economy (Das deutsche Handwerk. Eine Säule der Wirtschaft im Wandel, Hamburg), Hamburg 2006

[10] See Egon Tuchtfeld, Freedom of trade as a politico-economic problem (Gewerbefreiheit als wirtschaftspolitisches Problem), Berlin 1955

[11] See the Judgment of the Federal Constitutional Court, Resolution of 17.7.1961, BvL 44/55, in: Federal Constitutional Court (BverfGE) 13, 97, P. 104 f

German business law
Economy of Germany